"The Swedish Tiger" was the eleventh episode of the first series of the British television series, Upstairs, Downstairs. The episode is set in October 1908.

"The Swedish Tiger" was among the episodes omitted from Upstairs, Downstairs initial Masterpiece Theatre broadcast in 1974, and was consequently not shown on US television until 1989.

It is generally considered the weakest episode of the series, due to its muddled dialogue and confusing nature.

Cast
Regular cast
 Nicola Pagett (Elizabeth Bellamy)
 Simon Williams (James Bellamy)
 Pauline Collins (Sarah)
 Christopher Beeny (Edward)

Guest cast
 Geoffrey Whitehead ( Captain Axel Ryttsen)
 Sven-Bertil Taube (Torkel Kraft)
 Peter Clay (The Jeweller)
 Gillian Lind (Flossie)
 Dorothy Black (Flo)
 Veronica Lang (The Jeweller's Wife)
 Colin Rix (The Policeman)
 Rex Robinson (Inspector Hurst)
 Doel Luscombe (The Art Dealer)

Plot
In October 1908, James Bellamy has invited a dashing Swedish military officer, Axel Ryttsen, to 165 Eaton Place.  Sarah Moffat falls in love with Ryttsen's valet, Torkel Kraft.  Kraft removes valuable household objects from the Bellamy house in order to pay off Ryttsen's gambling debts. They use Sarah as a patsy.  Sarah thinks, that she is helping Kraft who promises her that he will take her to Sweden. But Ryttsen and Kraft leave Sarah alone with the music: "one hapless servant girl who will certainly be dismissed".

References

External links
Updown.org.uk - Upstairs, Downstairs Fansite

Upstairs, Downstairs (series 1) episodes
1972 British television episodes
Fiction set in 1908